Shrinathpuram is an affluent locality situated in central Bareilly, Uttar Pradesh, India which lies on Nainital Road. Besides its central location from most parts of the city of Bareilly, the locality is popular among Bareilites for the "Shrinathpuram Sanatana Temple".

Getting there
Shrinathpuram is accessible by means of public transport including rickshaw, taxi or bus. The route to Shrinath Puram from Qutab Khana follows the Nainital Road towards Kudesiya railway crossing. The locality is located next to Nandi Heights Apartments on the Nainital Road and is located next to the "WAIPA" Bottle, a cut out of the bottle which was replaced by a thick steel made replica of a consumer goods product placed near an old defunct factory.

Security
Shrinathpuram is a secure colony with only one gated entry point, constantly attended by security guards, opening at the Nainital Road (Uttar Pradesh State Highway 37) near B.D.A. Colony.

Social and cultural events
Shrinathpuram is famous for its celebration of Indian festivals, including Holi and Diwali, and especially for the "Annakoot" which is organized every year on the day next to Diwali, i.e. Govardhan Puja.

References

Neighbourhoods in Bareilly